This article presents a list of the historical events and publications of Australian literature during 1898.

Books 

 Louis Becke – The Mutineer: A Romance of Pitcairn Island, with Walter James Jeffrey
 Guy Boothby
 Across the World for a Wife
 Pharos the Egyptian
 Ada Cambridge – Materfamilias
 Mary Gaunt – Deadman's: An Australian Story
 Gertrude Hart – Clouds That Pass
 Louise Mack – Girls Together
 Rosa Praed – The Scourge-Stick
 Douglas Sladen – Trincolox
 Ethel Turner – The Camp at Wandinong

Short stories 

 Louis Becke – Rodman the Boatsteerer and Other Stories
 Rolf Boldrewood – A Romance of Canvas Town and Other Stories
 Guy Boothby – Billy Binks, Hero, and Other Stories
 Albert Dorrington – "Castro's Last Sacrament"
 Edward Dyson
 Below and On Top
 "The Conquering Bush"
 Henry Lawson – "Bill, the Ventriloquial Rooster"
 Ethel Mills – "A Box of Dead Roses"
 K. Langloh Parker – More Australian Legendary Tales (edited)
 Roderic Quinn – "A Stripe for Trooper Casey"
 Steele Rudd – "On Our Selection"

Poetry 

 E. J. Brady 
 "The Great Grey Water"
 "Lost and Given Over"
 Christopher Brennan
 "The Forest of Night: 1898-1902: The Twilight of Disquietude: 36"
 "Towards the Source : 1894-97 : 25"
 Victor J. Daley
 At Dawn and Dusk
 "Correggio Jones"
 Edward Dyson – "Men of Australia"
 George Essex Evans – Loraine and Other Verses
 Ernest Favenc – "The Guard of the Northern Strait: A Song of Queensland"
 W. T. Goodge
 "Daley's Dorg Wattle"
 "Mulligan's Shanty"
 Henry Lawson – "Sydney-Side"
 Marion Miller Knowles – Songs from the Hills
 Breaker Morant – "Kitty's Broom"
 Will H. Ogilvie 
 "Abandoned Selections"
 "Bowmont Water"
 Fair Girls and Gray Horses: With Other Verses
 A. B. Paterson 
 "Saltbush Bill's Gamecock"
 "T.Y.S.O.N."
 Roderic Quinn
 "The Camp Within the West"
 "The Fisher"
 "The Hidden Tide"
 Thomas E. Spencer – "How M'Dougal Topped the Score"

Non-fiction 

 David Carnegie – Spinifex and Sand : A Narrative of Five Years' Pioneering and Exploration in Western Australia

Births 

A list, ordered by date of birth (and, if the date is either unspecified or repeated, ordered alphabetically by surname) of births in 1898 of Australian literary figures, authors of written works or literature-related individuals follows, including year of death.

 7 February – Jean Curlewis, poet and writer for children (died 1930)
 21 February – Llewellyn Lucas, poet (died 1967)
 17 July – Richard Harry Graves, poet and novelist (died 1971)
 23 September – Les Haylen, politician, playwright, novelist and journalist (died 1977)

Deaths 

A list, ordered by date of death (and, if the date is either unspecified or repeated, ordered alphabetically by surname) of deaths in 1898 of Australian literary figures, authors of written works or literature-related individuals follows, including year of birth.

 23 March – George Robertson, bookseller (born 1825)
 6 August – Ethel Pedley, musician and author of Dot and the Kangaroo and other works (born 1859)

See also 
 1898 in poetry
 List of years in literature
 List of years in Australian literature
1898 in literature
1897 in Australian literature
1898 in Australia
1899 in Australian literature

References

Literature
Australian literature by year
19th-century Australian literature
1898 in literature